Jesse Peck Van Doozer (October 12, 1871 – September 23, 1929) was an American football player and coach. He was the fourth head football coach at Northwestern University, serving for one season, in 1897, and compiling a record of 5–3. Van Doozer played college football for four seasons at Northwestern, between 1892 and 1896. In 1894, he dropped out of Northwestern to play one season with the Chicago Athletic Association (CAA). He also played left halfback in the CAA's Thanksgiving Day game against the Boston Athletic Association in 1895, after being recruited with Northtwestern teammate Albert Potter by the CAA's athletic manager, Harry Cornish.

Van Doozer died on September 23, 1929, at a hospital in San Francisco, California from peritonitis after an emergency surgery.

Head coaching record

References

1871 births
1929 deaths
19th-century players of American football
American football halfbacks
Chicago Athletic Association players
Northwestern Wildcats football coaches
Northwestern Wildcats football players
People from Osceola, Nebraska
Players of American football from Nebraska
Deaths from peritonitis